New Sharon may refer to a place in the United States:

New Sharon, Iowa
New Sharon, Maine
New Sharon, New Jersey